John Sexton is an Australian film producer.

In the 1990s he produced a series of international co production TV movies with imported stars where the theme was "women under threat".

Filmography
Fatty Finn (1980) - executive producer
Ginger Meggs (1982) - story, producer
Phar Lap (1983) - producer
Burke & Wills (1985) - producer
Bodysurfer (1989) (TV) - executive producer
Minnamurra (1989) - writer, producer
Crimebroker (1993) - producer
The Seventh Floor (1994) - story, producer
Blackwater Trail (1995) - producer
Back of Beyond (1995) - producer
Little White Lies (1996) - producer
The Love of Lionel's Life (2000) - executive producer

References

External links
John Sexton at IMDb
John Sexton at Screen Australia

Australian film producers
Year of birth missing (living people)
Living people